Argia sedula, the blue-ringed dancer, is a species of narrow-winged damselfly in the family Coenagrionidae. It is found in Central America and North America.

The IUCN conservation status of Argia sedula is "LC", least concern, with no immediate threat to the survival of the species. The population is stable.

References

Further reading

 
 
 
 

Coenagrionidae
Insects described in 1861